Charles A. Holt (born October 2, 1948) is a behavioral economist, the A. Willis Robertson Professor of Political Economy at the University of Virginia. He also teaches public policy at the Frank Batten School of Leadership and Public Policy. He developed with Susan K. Laury, the main test to measure risk aversion in 2002.

He wrote Markets, Games & Strategic Behavior, .

References

External links 
 A Short Biography of Charles A. Holt (PDF)
 Games and Strategic Behavior by Charles A. Holt (PDF)

1948 births
Living people
Behavioral economists
Experimental economists
21st-century American economists
University of Virginia faculty